The Sunrise Formation is a geologic formation in Nevada. It preserves fossils dating back to the  Hettangian to Sinemurian stages of the Early Jurassic period.

Fossil content 
Among others, the following fossils have been reported from the formation:
Ammonites

 Alsatites proaries
 Arnioceras ritterbushi
 A. sparsum
 Coroniceras involutum
 C. luningense
 Guexiceras profundus
 Tipperoceras mullerense
 Tmaegoceras nudaries

Bivalves

 Agerchlamys boellingi
 Jaworskiella siemonmulleri
 Trigonia aff. hemisphaerica
 Vaugonia cf. vancouverensis
 Frenguelliella sp.

Echinoids
 Plesiechinus hawkinsi

See also 
 List of fossiliferous stratigraphic units in Nevada
 Paleontology in Nevada

References

Bibliography 
 
 
 
 
 
 

Jurassic geology of Nevada
Jurassic System of North America
Hettangian Stage
Sinemurian Stage
Limestone formations of the United States
Sandstone formations of the United States
Shale formations of the United States
Siltstone formations
Shallow marine deposits
Paleontology in Nevada